The Samsung SGH-i627 is a smartphone manufactured by Samsung, and sold in the United States as the Propel Pro by AT&T wireless. The SGH-i627 is based on the Qualcomm MSM7201A ARM11 CPU, running the Windows Mobile 6.1 Standard operating system.
Designed with a slider form factor, the SGH-i627 includes a full QWERTY keyboard with center joystick control.  
It was designed out of efforts to combine the form factor of the popular original Propel with the features of the also very popular Blackjack II smartphone. Compared to original Propel being available in several colors, the SGH-i627 is only available in chrome, which was chosen to make it more appealing to business users.

References

External links
 Samsung SGH-i627 User Manual (English) (.pdf, 22.4 mb)

Samsung mobile phones
Mobile phones introduced in 2009
Windows Mobile Standard devices
Mobile phones with an integrated hardware keyboard
Slider phones